Anne Joseph Hippolyte de Maurès, Comte de Malartic (3 July 1730, Montauban - 28 July 1800, Port-Louis, Mauritius) was a French colonial governor and general, notable for his service in Canada and Mauritius. 

During the French Revolutionary period, Malartic refused to give sailor captain Robert Surcouf a letter of marque, but ordered Surcouf's ship, the Émilie to go to the Seychelles to purchase tortoises as food for Isle de France.

Fate
Governor Malartic died at the age of 70. He suffered a stroke on 26 July 1800 while going to church, and died two days later.

The Canadian town of Malartic is named after him.

References

Further reading 

 Tugdual de Langlais, L'armateur préféré de Beaumarchais Jean Peltier Dudoyer, de Nantes à l'Isle de France, Éd. Coiffard, 2015, 340 p..
 Tugdual de Langlais, Marie-Etienne Peltier, Capitaine corsaire de la République, Éd. Coiffard, 2017, 240 p.

External links 
Quebec History
 
Mauritius
 Site de la Société de l'Histoire de l'Ile Maurice : https://www.soc-histoire-maurice.org

1730 births
1800 deaths
French military personnel of the War of the Austrian Succession
French people of the French and Indian War
French military personnel of the French Revolutionary Wars
French colonial governors of Guadeloupe
Abolitionism in France